Yustinus is a masculine Indonesian given name. It is Indonesian for Justin or Justinian. Notable people with the name include:

 Yustinus Murib, (died 2003) West Papuan Independence rebel leader
 Yustinus Pae, Indonesian soccer player

Indonesian masculine given names
Masculine given names